The Commissioner for Internal Market is a member of the European Commission. The post is currently held by Commissioner Thierry Breton.

Responsibilities
The portfolio concerns the development of the 480-million-strong European single market, promoting free movement of people, goods, services and capital. Thus it is clearly a leading role but has become more complex as the single market for services has developed. A large area of work is now financial services, a politically sensitive topic for some member states (notably, the UK). The Commissioner controls the Directorate-General for Internal Market and Services, Directorate-General for Communications Networks, Content and Technology and the Office for Harmonization in the Internal Market.

Elżbieta Bieńkowska (2014–2019)
Elżbieta Bieńkowska is a former Polish regional development minister and deputy prime minister. A self-described technocrat, she was appointed by European Commission president Jean-Claude Juncker.

Michel Barnier (2010–2014)
Barnier's appointment was controversial for some. His nomination came after the late 2000s recession led to criticism of bankers by many. Especially in France, there was a desire to more regulate the financial services sector, which in Europe is largely based around the City of London. French President Nicolas Sarkozy's declaration that Barnier's (then French foreign minister) appointment as Internal Market Commissioner was a "victory" produced considerable worry in the UK that France would use Barnier to push French-inspired restrictive regulation upon the UK's financial centre. Although he said that "we need to turn the page on an era of irresponsibility; we need to put transparency, responsibility and ethics at the heart of the financial system", he has tried to soothe worries in the UK and has reiterated his independence from national influence.

Charlie McCreevy (2004–2010)

Charlie McCreevy's stated priorities were:
 To maximise the potential of the Internal Market to boost growth and employment.
 To eliminate remaining barriers to an effectively functioning internal market for services across member states.
 To deepen the integration of Europe's capital markets and improve its financial infrastructure so that the cost of capital is reduced, the inefficiencies of fragmentation are minimised and competition is intensified, to the overall benefit of Europe's economy.
 To ensure that existing internal market rules are properly enforced.
 To improve public procurement procedures to ensure that the European taxpayer gets value for money.
 To ensure an effective framework for the protection of intellectual property rights to encourage innovation in the new knowledge economy.

Directives McCreevy was involved with include the directives on:
 Services in the internal market
 Patentability of computer-implemented inventions

Frits Bolkestein (1999–2004)

Commissioner Frits Bolkestein (Netherlands) served in the Prodi Commission between 1999 and 2004. In addition to holding the Internal Market portfolio, he also held Taxation and Customs Union. His head of cabinet was Laurs Nørlund.

Bolkestein is most notable for the Directive on services in the internal market, which is commonly called the "Bolkestein Directive". The directive aimed at enabling a company from one member state to recruit workers in another member state under the law of the company's home state. It was to help the development of the internal market for services, the development of which has lagged behind that for goods.

However, there was a great deal of concern about its effect on social standards and welfare, triggering competition between various parts of Europe. This led to significant protests across Europe against the directive, including a notable protest at the European Parliament in Strasbourg by port workers, which led to damage to the building. MEPs eventually reached a compromise on the text and the Parliament adopted it on 12 December 2006; 2 years after Bolkestein left office, under the Barroso Commission.

List of commissioners

See also
 Directive on services in the internal market
 Directorate-General for Internal Market and Services
 European Commissioner for Competition
 European Commissioner for Enterprise and Industry
 Markets in Financial Instruments Directive
 Office for Harmonization in the Internal Market

References

External links
 Barnier's website ec.europa.eu
 Commission Internal Market website ec.europa.eu
 Internal Market and Services DG website ec.europa.eu
 Q&A: Services Directive news.bbc.co.uk
 Services in the Internal Market euractiv.com
 Archived McCreevy website ec.europa.eu
 Interview with Charlie McCreevy by Jamie Smyth ireland.com
 Charlie McCreevy, European Commissioner responsible for Internal Market and Services eupolitix.com
 Archived Bolkestein website ec.europa.eu

Internal Market and Services
Commissioner Internal Market